The Pierides Museum is a museum in Larnaca, Cyprus that was founded by the Pierides Foundation. It is the nation's oldest private museum.

The placard on the museum building says (as of 2013) "Perides Museum - Bank of Cyprus Cultural Foundation". The collection was initiated by Demetrios Pierides, in the 19th century (1811 - 1895), with the aim of protecting and preserving Cyprus' antiquities and preventing the loss of the island's history.

The collections were built by five generations of the family. The archaeological collection is housed in the old residence of the Pierides family, a colonial style building, built in 1825. The exhibits beginning from the Neolithic times through the Bronze Age, Geometric, Archaic, Hellenistic, Roman and Byzantine - Medieval ages.

There is also a cartography collection of old maps and charts of Cyprus and the Eastern Mediterranean as well as a collection of Greek and Roman glassware.

Currently the museum is managed by Peter Ashdjian, an 8th generation Pierides.

On display
The oldest objects on display are from 40th century BC.

Objects on display include Red Polished Ware from the early Bronze Age, Roman glassware and medieval ceramic dishes.

Halls 
Hall 1: Prehistoric finds from approx. 7000 to 475 BC Chr.

Hall 2: Finds from Archaic to Roman times, approx. 750 BC BC to AD 395

Hall 3: Cartography from the Venetian period to the end of the British occupation, approx. 1489 to 1960 AD.

Hall 4: Hellenistic and Roman glass, approx. 325 BC BC to AD 395

Hall 5: Franconian ceramics, approx. 1191 to 1489 AD

Larnaca Biennale 
The Museum participates in the Larnaca Biennale, displaying contemporary art since 2018.

See also
Pieridis Museum

References 

Larnaca
Year of establishment unknown
Archaeological museums in Cyprus